George of Austria (Ghent, 1505 – Liège, 4 May 1557), was Prince-bishop of Liège from 1544 to 1557.  

He was an illegitimate son of Maximilian I, Holy Roman Emperor and Margaretha of Edelsheim. He became Bishop of Brixen (Tyrol) between 1525 and 1537 and Archbishop of Valencia between 1538 and 1544.

In 1544 he became Prince-bishop of Liège by the influence of his nephew Charles V, Holy Roman Emperor, a post he held until his death. George strongly opposed any French influence in the Prince-Bishopric of Liège, thus maintaining the strong grip of the Habsburgs, who controlled all surrounding lands.
In 1554, he was faced with a French invasion under King Henry II of France.

References 

1505 births
1557 deaths
16th-century House of Habsburg
People of the Habsburg Netherlands
Prince-Bishops of Liège
16th-century Roman Catholic bishops in the Holy Roman Empire
Archbishops of Valencia
Sons of emperors
Sons of kings
Illegitimate children of Holy Roman Emperors